Kyle Ranch or Kiel Ranch, was one of the earliest ranches established in Nevada's Las Vegas Valley. Founded by Conrad Kiel in 1875, today the location of the former ranch is in North Las Vegas, where the city maintains the remnants of the site as the "Kiel Ranch Historic Park." The original adobe structure, one of the oldest buildings in Las Vegas, a wooden shed known as the "Doll House," and the cemetery are all that remain after loss of buildings through fire and neglect. Also within the park is an artesian well and a small wetlands, a reminder of what drew travelers and early settlers to the area (the spring provided water allowing the ranch to grow fruits and vegetables). Presently the ranch's location is memorialized with Nevada Historical Marker number 224.

History
In 1855, with the intention of creating a base of location for Mormon settlers, William Bringhurst and other Mormon missionaries started their foray into the Las Vegas Valley. Basic infrastructure was built in the months and years that followed, including a fort (extant portions of which are preserved at the Old Las Vegas Mormon Fort State Historic Park) and rudimentary irrigation trenches. Despite their efforts, however, by 1857, the Mormons who settled in the area left the valley due to various reasons, including a drought and the impending Utah War. 

Nevertheless, the infrastructure that the Mormon missionaries built resulted in non-Mormon migrants moving the area, including Octavius Decatur Gass, who was one of Conrad Kiel’s friends. Gass established his ranch at the site of the Mormon fort, and ended up becoming a successful trader and rancher. Kiel eventually followed Gass and built a ranch not far from Gass' home in 1875. Kiel's land surrounded a natural spring and artesian well, and there he established a 240-acre homestead where he grew citrus trees, apples, and vegetables. The area Kiel settled is believed to be the spot where Mormon missionaries tried to settle Native Americans and teach them to farm; the adobe building at the site may date from the Mormon period.

In 1884, Archibald Stewart, an early pioneer in the area, was killed in a gunfight on the ranch. Stewart's wife, Helen J. Stewart, would go on to be an influential citizen of Las Vegas. Several years later, in 1900, Ed Kiel and William Kiel, then owners of the ranch, were found shot to death in what was believed (at the time) to be a murder-suicide. The bodies were exhumed in the mid-1970s, and it was determined that they had both been murdered.

Part of the ranch was sold in 1903 to William A. Clark to build the line for the San Pedro, Los Angeles and Salt Lake Railroad.

In 1911, Las Vegas banker John S. Park purchased the ranch and built a mansion known as the White House. Subsequent owners included Edwin Taylor (1924–39), whose cowboy ranch hands competed in national rodeos, and Edwin and Bette Losee (1939–58), who developed the Boulderado Guest Ranch here, a popular residence for divorce seekers during Nevada's heyday as a place to reside while waiting to get an easy divorce under the state's liberal laws.

Site preservation
A  portion of the original ranch site was listed on the National Register of Historic Places in 1975.  At the time, it included five contributing buildings.

By 1976, a portion of the ranch (which included its main buildings) was purchased jointly by the City of North Las Vegas and its Bicentennial Committee, and a restoration of the site was planned. The restoration plans of 1970s fell through, and the city was criticized at times for allowing the site to fall into disrepair and for a 1992 fire, which destroyed the ranch's White House mansion. Later, the city sold off all but  of the ranch land to build an industrial park. In 2006, there were concerns over water runoff from the spring and wetlands flowing into the industrial park. The city's plan to destroy more of the site to divert the water was met with opposition. The ranch site was also used as a dump by the city potentially destroying much of its value as an archaeological site.

By 2010, the city had committed to preserving what was left at the site. A historic park, which includes the few extant parts of the ranch, was opened on June 30, 2016.

Cemetery
The ranch included a cemetery, which was formerly located at the corner of Carey Avenue and Commerce Street; this part of the former ranch was not sold to the city in the 1970s. In 1975, anthropologists at the University of Nevada, Las Vegas (UNLV) exhumed the bodies from the cemetery. This had been done at the request of the city, as it desired to move the bodies onto the city-owned property, and properly mark the graves with headstones. Five bodies in total were removed and taken to UNLV to be studied. There they remained for nearly 45 years, until they were reburied in the historic park during December 2019.

Notes

References

External links
 Kiel Ranch Historic Park, City of North Las Vegas website

National Register of Historic Places in Clark County, Nevada
History of the Mojave Desert region
Buildings and structures in North Las Vegas, Nevada
Ranches on the National Register of Historic Places in Nevada
Historic American Buildings Survey in Nevada